The Kitsai (also Kichai) language is an extinct member of the Caddoan language family. The French first record the Kichai people's presence along the upper Red River in 1701. By the 1840s Kitsai was spoken in southern Oklahoma, but by the 1930s no native speakers remained. It is thought to be most closely related to Pawnee. The Kichai people today are enrolled in the Wichita and Affiliated Tribes (Wichita, Keechi), Waco and Tawakonie), headquartered in Anadarko, Oklahoma.

Phonology

Consonants
Kitsai's consonant inventory consists of the phonemes shown in the chart below. The phoneme /c/ is analyzed below as a palatal stop, even though its typical realization is alveolar with delayed release, so as to not have an affricate "series" consisting of only one phoneme. Similarly, /w/ is analyzed as a velar (i.e. labio-velar) rather than a labial so as to not be the only labial consonant.

Vowels
Kitsai has the following vowel phonemes:

Documentation
Kitsai is documented in the still mostly-unpublished field notes of anthropologist Alexander Lesser, of Hofstra University. Lesser discovered five speakers of Kitsai in 1928 and 1929, none of whom spoke English. Communicating to the Kitsai speakers through Wichita/English bilingual translators, he filled 41 notebooks with Kitsai material.
 
Kai Kai was the last fluent speaker of Kitsai. She was born around 1849 and lived eight miles north of Anadarko. Kai Kai worked with Lesser to record vocabulary and oral history and prepare a grammar of the language.

In the 1960s, Lesser shared his materials with Salvador Bucca of the Universidad Nacional de Buenos Aires, and they published scholarly articles on Kitsai.

Vocabulary
Some Kitsai words include the following:

Bear: Wari:ni
Corn: Kotay
Coyote: 'Taxko
Grass: A'tsi'u
Man: Wí:ta
Sweet potato: 'Ihts
White: Kaxtsnu
Wind: Ho'tonu
Woman: Tsakwákt

Notes

References
 Sturtevant, William C., general editor, and Raymond D. Fogelson, volume editor. Handbook of North American Indians: Southeast. Volume 14. Washington DC: Smithsonian Institution, 2004. .

External links 
 Kitsai, Native Languages
 Caddoan languages and peoples

Caddoan languages
Extinct languages of North America
Wichita tribe
Languages extinct in the 1930s